The Crees of the Waskaganish First Nation or Cree Nation of Waskaganish is a Cree First Nation of Canada. Waskaganish means Little House. It is headquartered in the Cree village of Waskaganish, Eeyou Istchee territory equivalent in Nord-du-Québec (Northern Quebec), Canada. Waskaganish terre réservée crie, or Cree reserved land, is a reserve for the Nation. The village is at the north end of the reserve. The reserve is situated on the southern shore at the mouth of the Rupert River as it empties into the southeast end of James Bay.

References

First Nations in Quebec